Viking Wind Farm is a wind farm under construction which is being developed by Viking Energy, a partnership between Shetland Islands Council and SSE plc.

Construction started in September 2020 and should be complete by 2024.

History

Initial plan
In 2005 SSE and Shetland Islands Council (via development company Viking Energy.) signed a memorandum of understanding to combine independent proposals for 300 MW wind farms  on mainland Shetland and jointly develop a large scale (600 MW) wind farm. The companies formalised the agreement in January 2007.

In 2009 the developers submitted a planning application for 150 turbines (estimated 600 MW capacity) on the main island of Shetland.

The development was dependent on the Shetland HVDC Connection being built connecting Shetland to the UK mainland's national grid. The cost of the connector was estimated at £300 million in late 2011; Viking Energy would be liable for 10% or less of the cost, other energy producing projects in Shetland, such as Aegir wave farm,  were also dependent on the grid connector being built.

The scheme proved contentious with both significant opposition and support, receiving 2,772 formal objections and 1,115 in support, as well as objections from RSPB Scotland; in part due to concerns on its impact on the rare Whimbrel.

Approval and legal challenges
The converter station at Kergord for the HVDC link to the Scottish mainland reached an initial stage of planning consent in early 2011, after several previous attempts starting 2009. The reduced development had an estimated capacity of up to 370 MW. The income from the development to shareholder Shetland Islands Trust was estimated at £20 million pa and the capital cost of the development was estimated at £556 million.

In September 2013 a ruling on an objection from Sustainable Shetland to the development held that the consent given under section 36 of the Electricity Act 1989 was incompetent because Viking Energy did not hold a license under the 1989 Act, and that the Scottish Ministers had failed to have proper regard to their obligations under the Birds Directive [2009/147/EC] to the protected Whimbrel species.

In October 2013 the Scottish Government signalled its intention to appeal the decision. In July 2014 appeal judges at Edinburgh's Court of Session announced that there was insufficient reason to stop the wind farm and gave the project the go-ahead.  Sustainable Shetland appealed the decision at the Supreme Court of the United Kingdom but lost the appeal in February 2015. They were also refused leave to appeal to the European Court of Justice. Viking applied to get electricity price subsidies under the UK government's low carbon "Contracts for Difference" programme. Due to the slow progress of Viking's application two of their four staff were made redundant  in 2017.

Recent history
In 2019, Viking Energy was unsuccessful in winning a CfD contract in the government auction held in September 2019, making the future of the windfarm uncertain. 

The wind farm depends on the construction of the Shetland HVDC Connection. In April 2020, Ofgem approved revised proposals for that project, subject to 'evidence that the Shetland Viking Wind Farm project will go ahead'.

On 17 June 2020, the project sponsor, SSE Renewables, made a final investment decision to proceed with the Viking Wind Farm investment, conditional on certain industry code modifications, and "the outcome of the consultation on Ofgem’s minded-to position to approve the transmission link, expected in July 2020".

According to Shetland News, this means that both the Windfarm and the HVDC Connection "are likely to go ahead".

Construction works started in September 2020 and the farm is due to be operational by 2024.

Design
If constructed, turbines would be erected in Kergord, North Nesting, and South Nesting.  Original proposals included 24 turbines in the Delting area (refused 2012 consent.) and 23 turbines in the Collafirth area (removed from application.)

Estimated construction time for the 127 turbine farm was 5 years. The wind farm was expected to have a high utilisation rate, smaller wind turbines on the island having  attained high capacity factors of over 50%.

Objections
Initially proposed as a 150 turbine 600 MW project in 2009, the scheme had significant opposition, on grounds including effects on wildlife, and the general environment; part of the wind farm was also removed because of a potential interference with equipment at Scatsta Airport.

Notes

References

Sources

External links

, documentation
, map of 2010 application wind turbine placement

Wind farms in Scotland
Energy in Shetland
Proposed buildings and structures in Scotland
Mainland, Shetland